The 2019–20 Rice Owls men's basketball team represented Rice University in the 2019–20 NCAA Division I men's basketball season. The Owls, led by third-year head coach Scott Pera, played their home games at Tudor Fieldhouse in Houston, Texas as members of Conference USA. They finished the season 15–17, 7–11 in C-USA play to finish in 12th place. They lost in the first round of the C-USA tournament to FIU.

Previous season
The Owls finished the 2018–19 season 13–19 overall, 8–10 in C-USA play to finish in four-way tie for 9th place. In the C-USA tournament, they were defeated by Marshall in the first round.

Offseason

Departures

Incoming transfers

2019 recruiting class

2020 recruiting class

Roster

Schedule and results

|-
!colspan=12 style=| Exhibition

|-
!colspan=12 style=| Non-conference regular season

|-
!colspan=12 style=| Conference USA regular season

|-
!colspan=9 style=| Conference USA tournament
|-

|-

Source

References

Rice Owls men's basketball seasons
Rice Owls
Rice Owls men's basketball
Rice Owls men's basketball